The Norfolk County Correctional Center is a house of correction located on the median of Route 128 in Dedham, Massachusetts. The facility has 502 beds and opened in 1992.  On average, there are 140 inmates who are serving sentences and 260 inmates waiting for trial. , the superintendent is Michael Harris. Harris replaced James O’Mara, who had served since October 2018.

The Correctional Center replaced the Norfolk County Jail.

References

See also 
 List of Massachusetts state correctional facilities

Buildings and structures in Dedham, Massachusetts
Prisons in Massachusetts
1992 establishments in Massachusetts